Terminus Panama is an Exo public transit (Exo) bus terminus in Brossard, Quebec, Canada. It is served by buses of the Réseau de transport de Longueuil as well as by routes of the RTM's Le Richelain and Roussillon.  Inaugurated in the fall of 1991, the original building was located at the intersection of Panama Street and Taschereau Boulevard.  It was adjacent to  both Autoroute 10 and Mail Champlain. The new building is located 70m south of the old terminal, situating itself closer to the new Panama station.

In 2006, a busway (bus lane) was constructed between the terminus and the Taschereau Interchange of Autoroute 10.

Starting September 2018, Terminus Brossard-Panama was progressively demolished to make way for the Panama station of the Réseau express métropolitain rapid transit network. A temporary bus terminal was implemented in 2020 in order to make way for additional construction. The new bus terminal opened partially on July 11th 2022, with the waiting area and entrance to the REM closed. The new terminal was named Terminus Panama, instead of Terminus Brossard-Panama, to not confuse it with the new Brossard Station.

Connecting bus routes

Réseau de transport de Longueuil bus routes

Inter municipal buses

RTM Roussillon (CITROUS)

Other inter municipal buses

See also 
 ARTM park and ride lots

References

External links 
 
 AMT Page on inter municipal bus services

Exo bus stations
Transport in Brossard
Buildings and structures in Brossard